Karkabud (also Romanized as Karkabūd) is a small, mountainous village in Bala Taleqan Rural District, in the Central District of Taleqan County, Alborz Province, Iran. At the 2006 census, its population was 127, in 39 families.

The village is in the upper part of Taleghan at 50 degrees and 49 minutes longitude and 36 degrees and 12 minutes latitude and 2271 meters above sea level located on the slopes of the mountain. Along the trees, there are alleys that connect different parts of the village to each other.

See also
Karkabud Waterfall

References 

Populated places in Taleqan County